Gol Mey-e Bala (also Romanized as Gol Mey-e Bālā) is a village in Sang Bast Rural District, in the Central District of Fariman County, Razavi Khorasan Province, Iran. At the 2006 census, its population was 52, in 12 families.

References 

Populated places in Fariman County